Mymensingh Medical College, formerly Lytton Medical School, is a public medical college and hospital in Mymensingh, Bangladesh. The institute was established in 1924 during the British Raj under the former name. Brigadier General Md. Golam Kibria is the present director of the medical college hospital.

History
During the later part of British Raj, it was felt that what was then Campbell Medical School of Calcutta and Mitford Medical School of Dhaka were unable to cater the needs of the growing population. As a result, in 1924 the Earl of Lytton, then-governor of Bengal, established the school in Mymensingh unde the name "Lytton Medical School". As a four-year college for the Licentiate of Medical Faculty (LMF). This course of LMF continued till 1962, when the undergraduate course length was increased to five years under Dhaka University and the school was renamed as Mymensingh Medical College.

Journal
Mymensingh Medical Journal, which is Index Medicus/MEDLINE listed, is the official journal of Mymensingh Medical College.

Notable alumni
 Tandi Dorji, Foreign Minister of Bhutan
 Kamrul Hasan Khan, Vice-Chancellor of Bangabandhu Sheikh Mujib Medical University (2015–2018)
 Mehdi Hasan Khan, software developer
 AKMA Muqtadir, ophthalmologist, recipient of Independence Day Award in 2020
 Taslima Nasrin, exiled writer
 Lotay Tshering, Prime Minister of Bhutan

Image gallery

See also
 List of medical colleges in Bangladesh

References

External links
 
 MMC website (http://mmc.gov.bd/)
Mymensingh Medical College on Facebook

Medical colleges in Bangladesh
Hospitals in Bangladesh
Educational institutions established in 1924
1924 establishments in India